Iizaka may refer to:

Iizaka, Fukushima, a former town in Fukushima, Japan
Iizaka Onsen Station, a train station in Iizaka, Fukushima
Fukushima Kōtsū Iizaka Line, the train line that links Iizaka Onsen Station to Fukushima Station